Joseph Ratuvakacereivalu (born 12 January 1999) is a Fiji international rugby league footballer who plays as a  for Redcliffe Dolphins in the QLD Cup.

Background
Ratuvakacereivalu played his junior rugby league for Campbelltown City Kangaroos.

Playing career
Ratuvakacereivalu represented Fiji in the 2019 Oceania Cup.

References

External links
Western Suburbs Magpies profile
Fiji profile

1999 births
Living people
Fiji national rugby league team players
Redcliffe Dolphins players
Rugby league props
Western Suburbs Magpies NSW Cup players